Aali en Nahri, is a village located in the Zahlé District of the Beqaa Governorate in Lebanon.

History
In 1838, Eli Smith noted  'Aly en-Nahry  as a Metawileh village in the Baalbek area.

References

Bibliography

External links
Aali en Nahri, localiban

Populated places in Zahlé District
Shia Muslim communities in Lebanon